Lomographa rara is a moth in the family Geometridae first described by Katsumi Yazaki in 1994. It is found in Taiwan.

The wingspan is about 28 mm. The wings are densely irrorated (sprinkled) with brownish fuscous.

References

Moths described in 1994
Lomographa
Moths of Taiwan